The Doughty Challenge Shield is a rugby union football trophy in Brisbane, Australia. 

Named for businessman Hector R. Doughty, a former marine engineer with the Queensland Harbours and Rivers Department and lightweight champion boxer, the Doughty Shield was awarded to the Brisbane A Grade Rugby Union Premiers from 1931 to 1941. 

The Doughty Shield was later resurrected as a First Grade knock-out competition from 1946 to 1951.

Since 1957, the shield has been awarded for the club championship in Brisbane, where selected teams from each club contributes to an overall points tally. In 2007, Premier Rugby (First Grade) was not included in calculations, but this change only lasted for one season. 5th Grade were included in the Doughty Shield calculations for the first time ever in 2013. As of 2020, the Club Championship is based on competition points won across 1st Grade to 5th Grade, Women and Colts 1 to Colts 3. 

.

List of "The Doughty Challenge Shield" Winners

See also
 Queensland Premier Rugby

References

Rugby union competitions in Queensland
Recurring sporting events established in 1929
1929 establishments in Australia
Sports leagues established in 1929